This is a list of current and former artists for Asylum Records.An asterisk (*) denotes an artist who no longer records for the label.

#
9th Wonder (It's A Wonderful World/Asylum Records)

A
Alesha Dixon *
Karen Alexander
Anne-Marie
A1k PG RA (rapper)*

B
Bun B (Rap-A-Lot/Asylum)
Tyra B
Batdorf & Rodney
David Blue
Bohagon
Bone Thugs-n-Harmony
Boosie Badazz
Terence Boylan
Lee Brice (Asylum-Curb)
Jackson Browne*
Brother Phelps
Lindsey Buckingham (US/Canada)*
Tim Buckley*
The Byrds*
ByrdGang (ByrdGang/Asylum Records)

C
Cadillac Don & J-Money
Call Me No One (7 Bros/Asylum)
Cam'Ron (Diplomat/Asylum)
Cate Brothers
Keith Carradine *
Cene (F.I.R.M. Grip/Asylum)
Charli XCX (Atlantic/Asylum)
Chingo Bling
Chopper City Boyz (Chopper City/Asylum)
Gene Clark
Joel Corry
C-Murder (Tru/Asylum)
Melodie Crittenden
Cowboy Crush (Asylum-Curb)
Creed
Crime Mob
Curren$y (Warner Bros/Asylum)

D
Stephanie Davis
Curtis Day
D4L
Diamond
Shea Diamond
  D-Rod (Rap Artist) (Asylum) *
Ned Doheny
Dolf (Rapper)
Bob Dylan (US/Canada)*
Devin The Dude (Asylum/Rap A Lot)
Dice SoHo (Asylum/MWA)
Dolo Tonight

E
Eagles*
Ed Sheeran
E-40 (Sick Wid It/BME/Asylum/Warner Bros.)
Ella Henderson

F
Dick Feller
Don Felder*
Glenn Frey*
Jay Ferguson
John Fogerty*
Foxx (Trill Ent./Asylum)
Frayser Boy (Hypnotize Minds/Asylum)
Richie Furay
Nelly Furtado (Geffen/Asylum/Elektra/WSM)

G
Gene Clark
Geto Boys (Rap-A-Lot/Asylum)
Bob Gibson
Ginuwine (Notifi/Asylum/Warner Bros.)
Louise Goffin
Andrew Gold
Steve Goodman
Gucci Mane (Brick Squad/Asylum/Warner Bros.)
General Geezy (Leesburg/Asylum/Warner Bros.)

H
John Hall
Jan Hammer
Emmylou Harris
Don Henley*
Chris Hillman
Greg Holland

I
ILoveMakonnen (GOPPOPO/Asylum/Warner Bros.)
Ironik
Iyaz (Beluga Heights/Reprise/Asylum/Warner Bros.)

J
Chris Jagger
Mark Jepson (& Deb Jepson-Xenides)
Jo Jo Gunne
Mike Jones* (Ice Age Ent./Asylum/Warner Bros. Rec.)
JR Writer* (Diplomat/Warner Bros. Rec.)
Jason Derulo (Beluiga Heights/Asylum/Warner Bros. Rec.)
Jay Rock (Topdawg Ent./Asylum)

K
Kandi Burruss (Kandi Koated/Asylum Records)
Kadalack Boyz (D-Lo Entertainment/ColliPark/Asylum Records)
King Co (Clover G/Southside Ryda Ent./Asylum Records
Kiotti
Kirko Bangz (LMG/Asylum/Warner Bros.)
KLC
Korgis
Kyuss
Willie The Kid (Aphilliates/Asylum)

L
Lil Wyte (Hypnotize Minds/Asylum)
Lil' Flip (Clover G/Asylum/Warner Bros. Rec.)
Lil' Wil (Rudebwoy/Unauthorized/Asylum)
Lil Scrappy (G's Up/Asylum/Reprise)
Lil' Cali (Yz'Gyz Ent/Mvp/Asylum)
Lil’ Smithy
Dennis Linde
Lil' Tazz (BigDawg Ent/GoBoy music)
Lil' Phat (Trill Ent./Asylum)

M

Majid Jordan (Asylum/OVOSOUND)
Lila McCann
Metallica
Metal Church
Joni Mitchell
Tim Moore
J.D. Myers
McLean
Morgan Connie Smith

N
Mark Nesler
New Boyz (Shotty Rec./Asylum/Warner Bros. Rec.)

O
OB O'Brien (OVO Sound/Asylum)
OJ Da Juiceman (So Icey/32 Ent/Mizay Ent/Asylum)
Oowee
Orleans
Outasight (Select Records/Asylum)

P
Parade *
Partners-N-Crime (UTP/Asylum)
PartyNextDoor (OVO Sound/Asylum/Warner Bros.)
Pimp C (Rap-A-Lot/Asylum)
Polo Boy(Asylum)
Project Pat(Asylum)
Prynce(O.F.F Records)

R
Terry Radigan
Rudimental
Linda Ronstadt*
Royal Wade Kimes

S
Sevendust (7 Bros/Asylum)
Kevin Sharp
Judee Sill
John David Souther
Souther-Hillman-Furay Band
Sada Baby (Skuba-Sharpshooter)"Thee 7-mile Goat"

T
Tim Moore
Tom Waits*

U
UTP
Ugly God

V
Joe Vitale

W
Tom Waits 
Waka Flocka Flame
Clay Walker (Asylum-Curb)
Paul Wall (Swishahouse/Asylum)
Joe Walsh
Jacky Ward
Jimmy Webb
Webbie (Trill Ent./Asylum/Atlantic)
Bryan White
Hank Williams, Jr. (Asylum-Curb)
Bob Woodruff*
Nicole Wray
Wu-Tang Clan
Wynonna (Asylum-Curb)

Y
Yonaka
Yo-Yo
Yukmouth (Smoke-A-Lot Rec./Rap-A-Lot Rec./Asylum)

Z
Z-Ro (Rap-A-Lot/Asylum)
Warren Zevon*

References

Lists of recording artists by label